EVN Group is an Austrian-based producer and transporter of electricity, one of the largest in Europe having over three million customers in 14 countries. The company also operates in water treatment, natural gas supply and waste management business areas. It is the second-largest utility in Austria.

Activities
In 2006, EVN Group produced around 3.45 billion kWh mainly from thermal power plants (68%) and renewable energy (hydro and wind) power plants (32%). EVN Group also distributed 19.2 billion kWh of electricity in Austria (37.9%), Bulgaria (37.95%, through subsidiary ) and North Macedonia (24.15%, through EVN AD Skopje).

The company also has power generation capacities of 1,450 MW, a transmission network of 1,370 km and a distribution network of 45,000 km. EVN Group is also involved in the natural gas sector having a total network length of 10,100 km. EVN itself owns 12.5% of Austrian peer Verbund.

Ownership
Less than 14% of EVN Group shares are free float on the Vienna Stock Exchange, with the state of Lower Austria holding 51 percent.

From 2002 until 2020, German utility EnBW owned around 35 percent of EVN Group. From 2015 on, EnBW reduced its share. In 2020, Wiener Stadtwerke became EVN’s second-largest shareholder after it bought EnBW’s remaining 28.35% stake, worth around 800 million euros ($894 million).

References

External links

Vienna Stock Exchange: Market Data EVN AG

Electric power companies of Austria
Economy of Lower Austria